Decline and fall of the Roman Empire may refer to:

 Fall of the Western Roman Empire
 The History of the Decline and Fall of the Roman Empire by Edward Gibbon

See also
 Late antiquity, the era of the decline and fall of Rome (Western Roman Empire)
 Historiography of the fall of the Western Roman Empire
 The Fall of the Roman Empire (film), 1964 U.S. film
 Roman Empire (disambiguation)
 Fall of Rome (disambiguation)